Bulinus reticulatus is a species group of a tropical freshwater snail with a sinistral shell, an aquatic gastropod mollusk in the family Planorbidae, the ramshorn snails and their allies.

References

Bulinus
Gastropods described in 1954